Glenn A. Dennison (born November 17, 1961) is a former American football tight end in the National Football League for the New York Jets and the 1987 Super Bowl winning Washington Redskins. In 1989, He played for the Amsterdam Crusaders in the Netherlands.  He played college football at the University of Miami and was drafted in the second round of the 1984 NFL Draft.

College Career & Statistics
Dennison was a three year starter for the University of Miami. He established school single season and career receptions records. 
Team MVP for the National Champion 1983 Miami Hurricanes football team. Caught two TD passes in the 1984 National Championship game. He was named AP 2nd team All American. Dennison was selected to play in the Shrine All Star Game and the Senior Bowl.

1981: 29 catches for 270 yards.
1982: 23 catches for 231 yards and 2 touchdowns.
1983: 54 catches for 594 yards and 3 touchdowns. 2 carries for 6 yards.

Professional Career

NFL
Dennison was selected in the 2nd round of the 1984 NFL Draft. As a rookie for the New York Jets in 1984, Dennison had 16 catches for 141 yards and 1 touchdown over 9 starts. He is a Super Bowl champion as a member of the 1987 Washington Redskins. He returned to the Jets for the 1988 season.

Europe 
In 1989, Dennison signed and played for the Amsterdam Crusaders helping the Crusaders to win the Dutch league Tulip Bowl championship in 1989 and 1990. He also helped the Crusaders reach the 1989 Eurobowl championship final, before losing 27-23 to the Legnano Frogs from Italy.

Post Football Career

He now works for FCC Environmental in Plant City, Florida.

External Links
 Hall of Fame bio  

1961 births
Living people
American football tight ends
New York Jets players
Washington Redskins players
Miami Hurricanes football players
People from Beaver Falls, Pennsylvania
People from Plant City, Florida
American expatriate players of American football
American expatriate sportspeople in the Netherlands